Lycée Claudel station (formerly Abbey station) is a bus stop on Ottawa's Transitway served by OC Transpo buses. It is located on Ottawa's Southeast Transitway, and is one stop south of the main hub of Hurdman. The station is named for the adjacent French private school Lycée Claudel d'Ottawa.

The station's former name Abbey refers to nearby Abbey Road, a short local road which is located further behind the school and the CN railway (which runs parallel to the Transitway). The Lycée Claudel stop is located between Riverside Drive and Old Riverside Drive just south of Hincks Lane.

The area has many high-density apartment complexes, which are the main trip generators for this station along with the students of Lycée Claudel.

Service

The following routes serve Lycée Claudel:

Notes 

References

External links
OC Transpo station page
OC Transpo Area Map

1991 establishments in Ontario
Transitway (Ottawa) stations